Kim Eun-hui (born 14 April 1973) is a South Korean judoka. She competed in the women's half-lightweight event at the 1992 Summer Olympics.

References

1973 births
Living people
South Korean female judoka
Olympic judoka of South Korea
Judoka at the 1992 Summer Olympics
Place of birth missing (living people)